Léo Chuard is a Swiss former professional ice hockey goaltender who briefly played in the Swiss League (SL). He also appeared in one game with Genève-Servette HC of the National League (NL) during the 2015-16 season.

Playing career
Chuard made his National League (NL) debut with Genève-Servette HC during the 2015-16 season, playing only 4 minutes in a single game. He never played for the team again before being loaned to HC La Chaux-de-Fonds of the Swiss League (SL) during the 2017-18 season. Chuard moved overseas to play the 2018/19 season with the Shreveport Mudbugs of the North American Hockey League (NAHL). He posted a .930 SVS% with a 2.38 GAA through 37 regular season games and a .936 SVS% in 10 playoffs games. Chuard started the 2019-20 season as a free agent before returning to Genève-Servette HC on December 16, 2019, agreeing to a one-year deal. On November 27, 2020, Chuard was loaned to the HCB Ticino Rockets of the Swiss League (SL) until the end of the year.

Personal life
Chuard was born and raised in Geneva, Switzerland and played all of his junior hockey with Genève-Servette HC's various junior teams.

References

External links

1998 births
Living people
Genève-Servette HC players
Swiss ice hockey goaltenders
Ice hockey people from Geneva